The Vatukoula mine is one of the largest gold mines in Fiji and in the world. The mine is located in Vatukoula in the south of the country on Viti Levu, the main Fiji island (home to the national capital Suva and its international airport Nadi).  

The mine shut down in December 2006 but reopened in April 2008 as the price of gold increased.  The mine has estimated reserves of 4.2 million oz of gold.

References 

Gold mines in Fiji
Viti Levu